Tahmasp Quli Khan (died 1626) was an aristocrat, who served as the Safavid governor of Kerman from 1624/1625. He was succeeded by Amir Khan Zul-Qadr.

Sources 
 

1626 deaths
Year of birth unknown
Safavid governors of Kerman
17th-century people of Safavid Iran